The 44th South American U20 Championships in Athletics were held at Villa Deportiva Nacional in Lima, Peru, between 9 and 10 July.

Medal summary

Men

Women

Mixed

Medal table

References

External links
Day 1 results
Day 2 results

South American U20 Championships in Athletics
South American U20 Championships in Athletics
South American U20 Championships in Athletics
South American U20 Championships in Athletics
Sports competitions in Lima
South American U20 Championships in Athletics